Chandrasena is a Sinhalese surname. It is also a male given name.

Notable people

Given name
 Chandrasena Hettiarachchi, Sri Lankan musician
 Chandrasena Jayasuriya (born 1935), Sri Lankan boxer
 Chandrasena Wijesinghe, Sri Lankan politician

Surname
 Kapila Chandrasena, Sri Lankan airline executive
 R. A. Chandrasena (1924–1980), Sri Lankan musician
 S. M. Chandrasena (born 1955), Sri Lankan politician

See also
 Chandrasena (1931 film), an Indian silent film
 Chandrasena (1935 film), a Hindi/Marathi mythology drama film 
 

Sinhalese masculine given names
Sinhalese surnames